Peter McCabe (born Peter Henry McCabe; 7 November 1945 – April 1998) was an English author and music journalist, who wrote in a variety of genres. He was an editor at Rolling Stone and Oui magazine, and is the former editor-in-chief of Country Music magazine and a nationally syndicated country music columnist.

McCabe wrote an article in the 28 February 1972 issue of New York magazine in which he alleged financial impropriety on the part of Allen Klein, manager of the Beatles' Apple Corps organisation, with regard to the dispersal of funds raised through US sales of George Harrison's The Concert for Bangladesh live album. The funds were intended for distribution to Bangladeshi refugees via UNICEF yet, according to McCabe, Klein's ABKCO company had withheld an amount of $1.14 per album. Klein responded with a $150 million libel suit, which he later withdrew.

Later in 1972, McCabe's book Apple to the Core: The Unmaking of the Beatles, with co-writer Robert D. Schonfeld, was published by Pocket Books. The book focuses on the business problems that led to the group's break-up and again presented Klein in an unfavourable light. It was subsequently translated into Japanese as ビートルズの不思議な旅 /
Bītoruzu no fushigina tabi, and into Dutch as "Apple" tot op het klokhuis; Wat er met de Beatles gebeurde.

In 1984, he and Schonfeld co-authored a work containing interviews with John Lennon, titled John Lennon: For the Record. McCabe also wrote the 1975 book Honkytonk Heroes: A photo album of country music. His most widely known work, with 600 copies in US libraries, is Bad News at Black Rock: The Sell-out of CBS News (1987). He has also written several novels, including Cities of Lies (1993) and Wasteland (1994).

References

1945 births
Living people
Rolling Stone people
American magazine editors
American male non-fiction writers